The 2010 Eritrean–Ethiopian border skirmish was an armed skirmish between soldiers of the Eritrean and the Ethiopian armies fought at the border town of Zalambesa after Eritea claimed that Ethiopian forces crossed the border. The Ethiopian Government claimed Eritrea was trying to cover up an internal crisis by implicating Ethiopia.

Background 
Relations between Eritrea and Ethiopia have been brittle and tensions between the two countries have remained high after both countries fought each other in the Eritrean–Ethiopian War which lasted from 1998 to 2000, and since the end of the war there have been a number of small border skirmishes between the two countries.

Eritrea had also recently been slapped with sanctions by the United Nations, after it was accused of supplying arms and weapons to militants and the opposition to the Somalia Government. The sanctions also came after Eritrea refused to deal with a border dispute with neighbouring Djibouti.

Battle

Eritrean claims 
According to the Eritrean Information Ministry, Ethiopian forces crossed the border early on New Year's Day and engaged in a fierce battle with Eritrean troops using small arms, assault rifles, and rocket-propelled grenades. Ethiopian forces quickly withdrew back over the border, with Ethiopia having 10 killed, with 2 Ethiopian soldiers being taken prisoner. Several AK-47 assault rifles, a machine gun, and some radio equipment were left behind by the Ethiopian forces.

Ethiopian claims 
Ethiopian government spokesman Bereket Simon denied that any armed incursion had taken place, and claimed that the Eritreans were trying to cover up an attack by Eritrean rebels in which 25 Eritrean government soldiers were killed.

See also 
 Djiboutian–Eritrean border conflict
 Eritrean Army

References 

Ethiopia border skirmish
Eritrea-Ethiopia border skirmish
Eritrea-Ethiopia border skirmish
Eritrean–Ethiopian border conflict
Second Afar insurgency
Eritrean–Ethiopian border skirmish
Eritrean-Ethiopian border skirmish